Leadbetter Point State Park is a nature preserve and public recreation area located  north of the city of Long Beach, Washington, at the northern tip of  the Long Beach Peninsula. The state park is bounded by the Pacific Ocean to the west and Willapa Bay to the east and shares a border with the Willapa National Wildlife Refuge. The park's Martha Jordan Birding Trail goes through Hines Marsh, wintering grounds for trumpeter swans. Other park activities include hiking, boating, fishing, clamming, and beachcombing.

See also
Leadbetter Point

References

External links

Leadbetter Point State Park Washington State Parks and Recreation Commission 
Leadbetter Point State Park Map Washington State Parks and Recreation Commission

State parks of Washington (state)
Parks in Pacific County, Washington
Protected areas established in 1974